Active labour market policies (ALMPs) are government programmes that intervene in the labour market to help the unemployed find work. Many of these programmes grew out of earlier public works projects, in the United States particularly those implemented under the New Deal, designed to combat widespread unemployment in the developed world during the interwar period. Today, academic analysis of ALMPs is associated with economists such as Lars Calmfors and Richard Layard.  Demand-side policies are policies used by the government to control the level of Aggregate demand (AD).

Active labour market policies are prominent in the economic policy of the Scandinavian countries, although over the 1990s they grew in popularity across Europe. Notable examples include the New Deal in the UK and many welfare-to-work programmes in the US.

Origins of ALMPs

The first active labour market policy measures date back to 1951 with the creation of the Rehn-Meidner model in Sweden developed by two economists from the social democratic trade union movement to modernise post-war Swedish industry and enhance productivity by combining a unified wage policy of solidarity which, as it progressed centrally, eliminated the least competitive industries among the country while offering a substantial retraining package to the workers thus laid off so that they could join the more modern and efficient industries.

Attempts at active labour market policies were also made in Italy in the 1950s to train low-skilled workers in the south to join dynamic factories in the north.

Concept of Social Investment

Active labour market policies are based on the concept of social investment, which rests on the idea of basing decision-making on the welfare of society in quantifiable terms, by increasing the employability, incomes and productivity of economic agents, so this approach interprets state expenditure not as consumption but as an investment that will produce returns on the welfare of individuals. The adoption of this concept has thus added to the traditional task of social policy to maintain income levels that of promoting labour market integration by removing barriers to entry through state intervention.

Program types
According to Giulano Bonolli, there are four main categories of ALMPs:

Incentive reinforcement:  refers to measures aimed at increasing the work incentives of social benefit recipients.                                                                                                                                                                                                                                                       It consists of a negative incentive component which aims to shift people from welfare to work by reducing the amount and duration of passive benefits such as unemployment benefits in order to exert a stimulating pressure and accelerate the job search process. This is an approach particularly applied in liberal Anglo-Saxon countries such as the United States or the United Kingdom and more recently applied in Germany with the Hartz laws of 2003-2005 which considerably weakened the level of social assistance for long-term job seekers.                                                                                                                                                                                                                                                                                                                                                                                                                           A variant of this category takes the form of in-work benefits, which aim to encourage the acceptance by the recipient of low-wage work in order to eliminate the poverty trap phenomenon, which can lead recipients to prefer to live on social assistance, even if it is low when the difference between the passive and in-work benefit level is not sufficient. Thanks to this additional assistance the market income level is compensated by social transfers.
Public employment services, such as job centres and labour exchanges, help the unemployed improve their job search effort by disseminating information on vacancies and by providing assistance with interview skills and writing a curriculum vitae.
Upskilling : This category is based on a human capital investment approach, which aims to adapt workers' skills to labour market requirements through measures that may take the form of state-subsidised classes and apprenticeships helping the unemployed improve their vocational skills as a way to promote access to the labour market for workers with outdated skills or from certain disadvantaged groups such as early school leavers with few qualifications.                                                                                                                               It is widely applied in the Nordic countries and particularly in Denmark where it forms the core of the flexi security model which focuses on the empowerment of jobseekers by funding extensive training programmes which are accessible or even compulsory after one year of unemployment. The provision of basic education services can also play a role in improving human capital for certain categories such as recently arrived immigrant workers, Germany thus provided in the past few years German language skills courses that concerned 170 000 people, most asylum seekers in 2017 with efforts made to involve them into preparatory traineeship, These measures have had  the effect of increasing their productivity, reflected in the fact that immigrants with good German writing skills see their wage gap with natives reduced by 10%
Employment subsidies, either in the public or private sector, directly create jobs for the unemployed. These are typically short-term measures which are designed to allow the unemployed to build up work experience and prevent skill atrophy.

The politics of ALMPs
A number of authors have argued that countries with stronger left wing political parties and trade unions have more developed ALMP. On the other hand, social democratic parties may not promote ALMP if their constituents are well protected workers and hence face little risk of being unemployed. More recently, the notion that different types of ALMP have similar political determinants has been contested. In the United States and Great Britain, fragmented and under-resourced ALMPs have been attributed as a factor in the rise of populist backlash politics in the Rust Belt and post-industrial northern England during the mid-2010s.

Levels of Implementation

Active labour market policies in general are mainly prevalent in the Nordic countries (with the exception of Norway), notably in Denmark where such expenditure represented almost 2% of GDP in 2017 compared to an OECD average of 0.52% this same year whereas on the contrary, Eastern European countries invest less in these policies. (with the exception of Hungary).

Effectiveness
To confront the problems that technology, globalization, and demographic change pose to the labor market, having an effective set of active labor market policies  is critical. Active Labour Market Policies are a catch-all term for a variety of policies that fall into four major categories: vocational training, job search aid, wage subsidies or public works programs, and support for micro-entrepreneurs or self-employed people. Governments provide considerable fiscal resources to ALMPs (more than 0.5 percent of OECD nations' GDP in the last ten years) in order to reduce unemployment, raise labor income, and encourage the adoption of new technologies that enhance productivity. 
The effectiveness of these policies was examined in a recent research  through a systematic examination of more than 100 experimental evaluations that demonstrated the success of ALMPs applied across the world. Focused solely on programs assessed through Randomized Control Trials, taking advantage of the fact that there have been a flurry of RCTs in the last five years that have thrown fresh light on the impact and cost effectiveness of ALMPs. This concentrate on RCTs limits the number of relevant evaluations, but it allows for more attention on estimates with high internal validity and refinement of the metrics used to compare outcomes, resulting in more naturally comparable conclusions from individual evaluations.
The efficiency of multidimensional and complex policies like ALMPs is determined by how they are conceived, the quality of their execution, the context in which they were created, and the people they are intended to serve. A vocational training program, for example, may vary in cost and duration, curricular content, and whether or not, and how, the private sector participates, and may target a wide range of people, from seasoned software programmers in Tokyo or Chicago to poor youngsters in Madhya Pradesh. An analysis that overlooks these concerns is unlikely to provide policymakers with precise and conclusive insights. 
The efficiency of multidimensional and complex policies like ALMPs is determined by how they are conceived, the quality of their execution, the context in which they were created, and the people they are intended to serve. A vocational training program, for example, may vary in cost and duration, curricular content, and whether or not, and how, the private sector participates, and may target a wide range of people.  An analysis that overlooks these concerns is unlikely to provide policymakers with precise and conclusive insights.
When analyzing the overall impact of the four policy clusters studied, it is found that wage subsidies and independent worker support had the largest median influence on earnings, with gains of 16.7% and 16.5 percent, respectively, when compared to the control group. Vocational training programs, on the other hand, have a median impact of 7.7%, while employment services have a minimal influence. The median impact on employment follows a similar trend, with wage subsidies having the biggest influence on this outcome category, followed by independent worker aid and vocational training with median impacts of 11 percent and 6.7 percent, respectively. Surprisingly, employment services interventions had a median impact of 2.6 percent, which is consistent with short-term and low-cost interventions that aim to boost the inclination to obtain work rather than to build human capital. Importantly, the claimed effects on incomes and employment outcomes are quite variable.
When the data is available, a continuous variable is included to identify the intervention's average cost per person in 2010 Purchasing Power Parity (PPP) dollars. Only 51 interventions recorded this essential variable, and only 22 conducted a thorough cost-benefit analysis using net present value, internal rate of return, or payback periods, indicating a significant flaw in the impact evaluation literature's standard practice. Despite the small number of ALMPs for which cost data is available, several trends may be discerned. Wage subsidies, assistance for self-employed or micro-entrepreneurs, and vocational trainings all have similar median costs per participant, ranging between 1,744 and 1,518 2010 PPP US dollars, with the second category having substantially more fluctuation. Employment services, on the other hand, are far less expensive policies, with a median cost per participant of 277 US dollars in 2010 PPP values and no variation between programs.

Active labour market policies in the Czech republic
After three years of negative economic development, the Czech economy began to pick up speed, with GDP growth rates of 0.6 and 2.7 percent in 1993 and 1994, respectively. What's notable is that, notwithstanding the return to growth in 1993, the recorded unemployment rate stayed around the same low level from 1992 to 1994. However, as compared to the rates in 1993 and 1994, the average outflow rate was quite high in 1992, when the economy was still in decline. 
This might be because the budget for active labor market policies (ALMPs) in 1992 was very large compared to prior years.
ALMPs have reduced the number of people who have been jobless for a long time, such as women, Romanies, the disabled, the less educated, and those who have previously been unemployed. Furthermore, the ALMPs aided those who were getting unemployment benefits more than people who were not receiving unemployment benefits. This data is noteworthy because it supports the premise that district labor offices were driven to cut program expenditures.

See also
 Active Labor Market Policies in Denmark
 Earned income tax credit
 Job guarantee
 Mixed economy
 Social protection#Labor market Interventions
 Trade Adjustment Assistance
 Welfare capitalism

References

Further reading
Gottschalk, P. & Freeman, R.B. Generating Jobs: How to Increase Demand for Less-Skilled Workers, Russell Sage Foundation, 2000
Robinson, P. Active labour-market policies: a case of evidence-based policy-making?, Oxford Review of Economic Policy, Volume 16, No. 1, 2000

External links
 OECD – Active Labour Market Policies: Connecting People with Jobs

Work relief programs
Labour economics
Unemployment
Public economics
Welfare economics
Social programs